Sporminore (Sporpìcol, Sporpìzol or Sporpìciol in local dialect) is a comune (municipality) in Trentino in the northern Italian region Trentino-Alto Adige/Südtirol, located about  northwest of Trento.

Sporminore borders the following municipalities: Ton, Campodenno and Spormaggiore.

Demographic evolution

References

External links
 Homepage of the city

Cities and towns in Trentino-Alto Adige/Südtirol